José Cesário de Faria Alvim (7 June 1839 – 3 December 1903) was a Brazilian mayor of the Distrito Federal of Rio de Janeiro and Governor of Minas Gerais.

References

Mayors of Rio de Janeiro (city)
1839 births
1903 deaths